Wykery Copse is a  biological Site of Special Scientific Interest west of Bracknell in Berkshire.

Access

There is access from Green Walk.

Flora

The site has the following Flora:

Trees
Birch
Alder
Fraxinus
Maple
Quercus robur
Hazel
Ulmus minor 'Atinia'
Sorbus torminalis
Prunus avium
Rowan
Holly
Salix fragilis
Salix atrocinerea
Aspen
Malus
Populus x serotina
Prunus spinosa
Crataegus
Cornus
Quercus cerris

Plants
Honeysuckle
Ribes sylvestre
Viburnum opulus
Hyacinthoides non-scripta
Carex strigosa
Carex pallescens
Orchis mascula
Anemone nemorosa
Conopodium majus
Lamiastrum galeobdolon
Lysimachia  nemorum
Oxalis acetosella
Primula vulgaris
Scrophularia nodosa
Veronica montana
Melica uniflora
Milium effusum
Bromus ramosus
Hypnum cupressiforme

See also
List of Sites of Special Scientific Interest in Berkshire

References

Sites of Special Scientific Interest in Berkshire